is a national highway of Japan connecting Ōita, Ōita and Saiki, Ōita in Japan, with a total length of 92.3 km (57.35 mi).

See also

References

External links

National highways in Japan
Roads in Ōita Prefecture